Craig Taylor (born 1976) is a Canadian journalist and playwright currently  (2021?) living in London.

Taylor was born in Edmonton and grew up in Lantzville. He moved to London in 2000.

Bibliography

 Return to Akenfield: Portrait of an English Village (2007)
 State by State (Delaware) (2008)
Londoners (2011)
New Yorkers: A City and Its People in Our Time

References

Canadian journalists
Living people
Place of birth missing (living people)
1976 births